The Ethias Trophy is a professional tennis tournament played on indoor hard courts. It is currently part of the Association of Tennis Professionals (ATP) Challenger Tour. It has been held annually in Mons, Belgium, since 2005.

Past finals

Singles

Doubles

External links

ITF Search

 
ATP Challenger Tour
Hard court tennis tournaments
Indoor tennis tournaments
Recurring sporting events established in 2005
Tennis tournaments in Belgium
Tretorn SERIE+ tournaments
Sport in Mons
2005 establishments in Belgium